Henriquella is a genus of blow fly in the family Mesembrinellidae.

Species
H. spicata (Aldrich, 1925)

References

Mesembrinellidae
Diptera of South America